The European Space Astronomy Centre (ESAC) near Madrid in Spain is the ESA's centre for space science (astronomy, solar system exploration and fundamental physics). It hosts the science operation centres for all ESA astronomy and planetary missions together with their scientific archives. Past and present missions represented at ESAC include (in alphabetical order) Akari, BepiColombo, Cassini–Huygens, Cluster, Exomars, Gaia, Herschel, Hubble, ISO, INTEGRAL, IUE, LISA Pathfinder, Mars Express, Planck, Rosetta, SOHO, Solar Orbiter, Venus Express, and XMM-Newton.

Future missions to be represented from ESAC include Athena, Euclid, James Webb Space Telescope, JUICE, and Plato.

In addition to deep space and solar system exploration, ESAC hosts the data processing of SMOS, a satellite observing the earth, and the CESAR educational programme.

ESA's deep-space antenna in Europe is located in Cebreros, Avila, about 90 km from Madrid and 65 km from ESAC. This installation provides essential support to the activities of ESAC. Inaugurated in September 2005, Cebreros features a highly accurate pointing control system and a 35-metre antenna that allow ESA to gather data from distant missions to Mercury, Venus, Mars and beyond.

ESAC is also involved in ESA missions conducted in collaboration with other space agencies. One example is Akari, a Japanese-led mission to carry out an infrared sky survey, launched on 21 February 2006. Future collaborative programmes include the NASA-led James Webb Space Telescope, the successor to the Hubble Space Telescope.

In addition, ESAC also hosts the Spanish Astrobiology Centre (CAB), an innovative research facility aimed mainly at encouraging young Spanish scientists to enter the fields of astrophysics and fundamental physics.

ESAC is located in Villafranca del Castillo, within the town limits of Villanueva de la Cañada, is located 30 km west of Madrid in the Guadarrama Valley. Evergreen oaks and the ruins of a nearby 15th-century castle (the Castillo de Aulencia) make a spectacular backdrop for the high-tech vista of ESA's large antennas and modern buildings.

See also
 ESA Centre for Earth Observation (ESRIN)
 European Astronaut Centre (EAC)
 European Centre for Space Applications and Telecommunications (ECSAT)
 European Space Agency (ESA)
 European Space Operations Centre (ESOC)
 European Space Research and Technology Centre (ESTEC)
 European Space Tracking Network (ESTRACK)
 Guiana Space Centre (CSG)

References

External links

  European Space Agency site
    ESA/European Space Astronomy Centre site
 ESA/European Space Astronomy Centre site in Spanish
 ESA webpage on ESTRACK, including links to all stations
 ESA/ESTRACK Villafranca station page
 Spanish Astrobiology Centre site (CAB) 

Astronomy in Europe
European Space Agency
Space telescopes